Béchamel sauce is a sauce traditionally made from a white roux (butter and flour in a 1:1 mixture by weight) and milk. Bechamel may also be referred to as besciamella (Italy), besamel (Greece), or white sauce (U.S.). French, Italian and Greek bechamel sauce recipes include salt and nutmeg as a seasoning base.

Bechamel sauce is one of the "mother sauces" of French cuisine.

Origin

The first recipe of a sauce similar to bechamel is in the book  by François Pierre de La Varenne in 1651, made with a roux, as in modern recipes. The name of the sauce was given in honour of Louis de Béchameil, a financier who held the honorary post of chief steward to King Louis XIV of France in the 17th century.

The first named béchamel sauce appears in The Modern Cook, written by Vincent La Chapelle and published in 1733, in which the following recipe for "Turbots (a la Bechameille)" appears:

There are many legends regarding the origin of bechamel sauce. For example, it is said that it was created in Tuscany under the name "Salsa Colla" and brought to France with Catherine de Medici but this sauce was totally different from modern bechamel sauce.

Uses
Béchamel can be used as is in dishes such as lasagne al forno (Italian), moussaka (Greek), canelones (Catalan) or as the base for other sauces such as Mornay, which is béchamel with cheese. Béchamel is also used in the Greek dish pastitsio.

See also

 List of sauces

References

External links

 History and legends of Béchamel sauce
 Free Culinary School Video Episode 11—An educational podcast episode that talks about the classical French technique used for making Sauce Béchamel and a few secondary sauces including Mornay, Basic Cream, Cheddar Cheese and Mustard Sauce.
 

French sauces
Italian sauces
Mother sauces
White sauces